Repapa is a genus of crickets in the subfamily Landrevinae and tribe Landrevini.  Species can be found in South-East Asia.

Species 
Repapa includes the following species:
Repapa brevipes Chopard, 1937
Repapa denticulata Gorochov, 2016
Repapa sapagaya Otte, 1988 - type species (locality: Sandakan, Sabah)
Repapa tenompokae Otte, 1988
Repapa trusmadi Gorochov, 2016

References

External links
 

Ensifera genera
crickets
Orthoptera of Asia